Cummins Inc. is an American multinational corporation that designs, manufactures, and distributes engines, filtration, and power generation products. Cummins also services engines and related equipment, including fuel systems, controls, air handling, filtration, emission control, electrical power generation systems, and trucks.

Headquartered in Columbus, Indiana, Cummins sells in approximately 190 countries and territories through a network of more than 600 company-owned and independent distributors and approximately 7,200 dealers. Cummins reported a net income of $2.15 billion on sales of $28 billion in 2022.

History 

The Cummins Engine Company was founded in Columbus, Indiana, on February 3, 1919, by mechanic Clessie Cummins and banker William Glanton Irwin. The company focused on developing the diesel engine invented 20 years earlier, but despite several well-publicized endurance trials, it was not until 1933, that their Model H engine, used in small railroad switchers, proved successful. The Cummins N Series engines became the industry leader in the post-World War II road building boom in the United States, with more than half the heavy-duty truck market using a Cummins engine from 1952 to 1959. In the 1960s, the company opened an assembly plant in Shotts, Scotland (closed in 1996). By 2013, Cummins had operations in 197 countries and territories.

Business units

Cummins Engine Business 
Cummins Engine Business Unit consists of Aftermarket support, Mid-Range, Heavy-Duty, and High-Power Engines. Its markets include heavy-and medium-duty trucks, buses, recreational vehicles (RV), light-duty automotive, and several industrial uses including construction, mining, marine, oil and gas, railroad, and military equipment.

One of the most popular engines made by the company is the 5.9-liter in-line six-cylinder engine used in the Dodge Ram light-duty pickups starting in 1988.5. In 2007.5, a 6.7-liter version of the Cummins straight-six engine became optional on the RAM pickup. In 2008, Cummins was a named defendant in a class-action suit related to 1998-2001 model year Chrysler Dodge Ram trucks, model 2500 or 3500, originally equipped with a Cummins ISB 5.9 liter diesel engine built using a pattern 53 Block. The case has been settled, but some qualified Chrysler owners may receive $500 for repairs to the block, which was alleged to crack and create a coolant leak.

In April 2013, Cummins utilized technology developed by Westport Innovations to begin shipping large natural gas fueled engines to truck manufacturers in the United States as trucking companies began converting portions of their fleets to natural gas and the natural gas distribution network in the United States began to expand.

Cummins has a technical centre in Darlington, England, where it develops products for the European, Middle Eastern, and Asian markets.

Cummins Power Systems Business (formerly Cummins Power Generation)

Cummins Power Systems Business Unit consists of Alternators, Automatic Transfer Switches, Commercial Power Systems, Consumer Systems, Engines, and Paralleling Systems. 

All of the above stem from Cummins Onan, of which products are still in service today.

This Business Unit was formed recently, following a merge of the Power Generation Unit and High Horsepower Sub-Division.

On August 22, 2017, United Rentals announced it had acquired all mobile power generation assets from Cummins. To maintain fleet and customer service continuity, a small number of Cummins employees joined United Rentals.

Cummins Component Business 
Cummins Component Business Unit consists of Emission Solutions, Filtration (Fleetguard), Fuel Systems, Turbo Technologies (Holset), and Electronics. With regards to Turbo Technologies, Cummins designs and manufactures turbochargers and related products, on a global scale, for diesel engines above 3 liters. In regard to Emission Solutions, Cummins develops and supplies catalytic exhaust systems and related products to the medium-and heavy-duty commercial diesel engine markets. In regard to Filtration, Cummins designs, manufactures and distributes heavy-duty and light-duty air, fuel, hydraulic and lube filtration, chemicals and exhaust system technology products for diesel and gas-powered equipment. With regards to Electronics, Cummins designs engine control units and sensors for Cummins diesel engines.

Cummins Distribution Business 
Cummins Distribution Business consists of Engine and Power Generation Distribution as well as Service and Parts. The distribution unit of Cummins consists of 17 Cummins owned distributors and 10 joint ventures, covering 90 countries and territories through 234 locations.

Subsidiaries

Cummins Turbo Technologies 

The Holset Engineering Co. was a British company that produced turbochargers, primarily for diesel and heavy-duty applications.

In 1973 the company was purchased by Cummins after briefly being owned by the Hanson Trust. Holset now operates facilities in China, India, Brazil, the Netherlands, the United Kingdom, and the United States.

In 2006, the division officially changed its name to Cummins Turbo Technologies to be identified more closely with its parent company. The turbocharger products still use the Holset brand name.

Cummins Power Systems 

In 1986 Cummins began the acquisition of Onan and completed it in 1992. Since then, Onan has evolved into Cummins Power Generation (now Cummins Power Systems), a wholly invested division of Cummins. The Onan name continues to be used for modern versions of their traditional engine-driven generators for RV, marine, commercial mobility, home standby, and portable use.

Cummins Inc. (NYSE: CMI) announced that it will be unifying its brand strategy across its Power Systems business segment, which provides high-speed engines from 760 – 4400 HP and power generation equipment from 2–3,500 kW, including standby and prime power gen sets, alternators, switchgear and other components. Currently, the portfolio features the Cummins, Cummins Power Generation and Cummins Onan brands. With immediate effect, the branding will be consolidated under the Cummins brand. The Cummins Power Generation and Cummins Onan brands will be retired and the Onan name synonymous with mobile gensets, will be repositioned as a generator product line under the newly unified Cummins brand in the RV market.

Cummins Inc. will also be permanently changing all “Fun Roads” branding to Cummins RV moving forward as well and the Fun Roads brand will also be retired. As Onan will now be repositioned as an RV product line, with the new rv.cummins.com website and social media platforms serving as tools for RVers across the country to find relevant information like product specs and our sales and service locator.

“Looking to unify Cummins into one cohesive, unified brand, we decided that consolidating both products (engines and generators) into the Cummins RV family only strengthens the brand and more uniformly speaks to our manufacturers and consumers,” said Jodie Wilson. “The brand changing will not affect product or service offerings, but will help us to continue on our promise of delivering dependability across the globe.”

Rebranding took place globally on all marketing activities, as product branding changed across all manufacturing plants beginning July 2017.

Cummins Emission Solutions 

Exhaust and emissions after-treatment company Nelson Industries was purchased in 1999, due to the increasing importance of exhaust after-treatment systems for meeting future emissions standards. The division officially changed its name to Cummins Emission Solutions, in order to be identified more closely with their parent company.

China operations
Cummins has some joint ventures with Chinese manufacturers, such as Dongfeng Cummins, a joint venture with Dongfeng Automobile Company, as well as Guangxi Cummins Industrial Power with LiuGong.

Other entities were Cummins Beijing, Chongqing Cummins Engine, Xi’an Cummins Engine, Wuxi Newage Alternators, Xiangfan Fleetguard, Wuxi Cummins Turbo Technologies.

India operations
Cummins India is the Indian subsidiary of Cummins. Cummins India is publicly traded on the Bombay Stock Exchange (BSE) and the National Stock Exchange of India (NSE). Cummins began its India operations on 17 February 1962 in a joint venture with the Kirloskar Group. The ownership structure of the joint venture was divided as follows:
 Cummins - 50% 
 Kirloskar Group - 25.5%
 Retail Investors - 24.5%
In 1996 Cummins Inc. bought Kirloskar shares. Now it's Cummins Inc. subsidiary. 
As of 2013, the Cummins group had revenues over $1.5 billion, 20 factories and 9000 employees in India.

Cummins does a significant part of its R&D in India at the Cummins Research and Technology centre that was set up in 2003. Also, Cummins is building an advanced technical centre in Pune which will house over 2000 engineers.

Cummins India has also made significant contributions to local skill development by establishing the MKSSS's Cummins College of Engineering for Women, a women-only engineering college in Pune.

Current products 

IS (Interact Series) - family of engines used for on-highway applications, trucks, buses and RVs
ISF 2.8-liter I4 - used in GAZ GAZelle (Business and Next series) and Foton Tunland light trucks
ISV 5.0-liter V8 - used in the 2016 and newer Nissan Titan XD truck, up to 2019 model-year
ISB 5.9-liter I6, 190 HP - used in first, second, and third-generation Ram 2500 and 3500 trucks until 2007
ISB 6.7-liter I6 - used in third and fourth generation Ram 2500-5500 trucks, school buses, Alexander Dennis buses, medium-duty trucks, such as Freightliner and International. Used in Kenworth and Peterbilt called the Paccar PX6 or PX7. 
ISC 8.3-liter I6 - discontinued
ISL 8.9-liter - I6 - used for a variety of applications, and a very common engine for buses
ISL G 8.9-liter - I6 natural-gas-powered; used for a variety of applications 
ISM 11-liter I6 - used for a variety of vocational applications in lesser regulated areas
ISG 12-liter I6 - used primarily in Chinese HD trucks
ISX 12-liter I6 - used in heavy-duty trucks
ISX G 12-liter I6 - natural-gas-powered; used in heavy-duty trucks
ISD 12.4-liter I6 - used in tractor applications in lesser regulated areas
ISX 15 liter I6 - used in heavy-duty trucks
V555 9.1-liter V8 - used in heavy machinery and large trucks
V903 14.8-liter V8 - used in Bradley fighting vehicles and other military applications
QS (Quantum Series) - family of engines used for off-highway applications, such as marine, rail/industrial, construction, power generation and agriculture
QSF 2.8-liter I4
QSF 3.8-liter I4
QSB 4.5-liter I4
QSB 6.7-liter I6
QSL 9-liter I6
QSG 12-liter I6
QSX 15-liter I6
QSK 19-liter I6
QSK 23-liter I6
QST 30-liter V12
QSK 38-liter V12
QSK 45-liter V12
QSK 50-liter V16
QSK 60-liter V16
QSK 78-liter V18
QSK 95-liter V16
 X Series (Next-Generation) - evolution of IS engine family
 X12 
 X15 Performance 15-liter I6
 X15 Efficiency 15-liter I6

Concept vehicles
Cummins Aeos - An electric-powered conventional truck.

Clean Air Act violation
In 1998, the EPA announced fines totaling $83.4 million against Cummins and six other diesel engine manufacturers, the largest fine to date. The fines came after manufacturers evaded testing by deliberately deactivating emissions controls during highway driving, to give the appearance of being in full regulatory compliance during standard laboratory testing. The manufacturers also agreed to spend more than $1 billion to correct the problem. The trucks used engine ECU software to engage pollution controls during the 20-minute lab tests to verify compliance with the Clean Air Act, but then quietly disabled the emissions controls during normal highway cruising, thereby emitting up to three times the maximum allowed NOx pollution.

Carbon footprint
Cummins reported Total CO2e emissions (Direct + Indirect) for the twelve months ending 31 December 2020 at 595 Kt (-94 /-13.7% y-o-y). The company plans to reduce total emissions (Direct + Indirect) 50% by 2030 from a 2018 base year and also aims to reach net-zero by 2050.

See also 

 Cummins Corporate Office Building
 Cummins UK
 Cummins-Wärtsilä
 Komatsu
 J. Irwin Miller
 Brammo

References

External links

 Cummins Corporate Web Site
 Cummins Spare Parts Catalogue

 
Auto parts suppliers of the United States
Gas engine manufacturers
Diesel engine manufacturers
Locomotive engine manufacturers
Marine engine manufacturers
Motor vehicle engine manufacturers
Manufacturing companies based in Indiana
Vehicle manufacturing companies established in 1919
1919 establishments in Indiana
Companies listed on the New York Stock Exchange
Trucking industry in the United States
Columbus, Indiana
American brands
Fuel cell manufacturers
Electrical generation engine manufacturers
Turbocharger manufacturers